This is a comprehensive list of Iraqi security forces members killed in the Iraq War. There are also totals here for each year.

The "Iraq Index" of the Brookings Institution also keeps a running total of Iraqi security force casualties.

The highest reported number of policemen and soldiers killed in the war has been 15,196 for the period between January 2004 and December 2009 (with the exceptions of April 2004 and March 2009). With the previously reported 260 policemen and 23 Kurdish peshmerga fighters killed in 2003, and 67 dead in March 2009, and a further 1,100 deaths in 2010, and 897 deaths in 2011, the total number of security forces members killed can be estimated to be at least 17,543.

2017
Update needed.
Transcript of brett mcgurk presser suggests 2,000 Peshmerga killed and 10,000 Iraqi forces in fight against ISIS.
https://isis.liveuamap.com/en/2017/15-september-transcript-of-brett-mcgurk-presser-suggests

2011

2010

2009

Note: One report stated that 242 soldiers were killed in 2009, a higher number than the one given in the month by month breakdown. Also, a second report put the overall number of security forces killed in 2009, at 1,193. Almost double the toll claimed by the Iraqi government.

2008
 January
 January 1 - Various insurgent attacks in the country killed two policemen and one soldier.
 January 2 - Various insurgent attacks in the country killed three policemen and three soldiers.
 January 3 - Various insurgent attacks in the country killed four policemen and six soldiers.
 January 4 - Two policemen were killed when a suicide bomber attacked their checkpoint in Amara.
 January 6 - Four policemen and three soldiers were killed when a suicide bomber attacked the Iraq Army Day parade in Baghdad.
 January 8 - Various insurgent attacks in the country killed three policemen and one was captured.
 January 10 - Various insurgent attacks in the country killed two policemen and two soldiers.
 January 12 - Various insurgent attacks in the country killed two policemen.
 January 13 - One policeman was killed in Baghdad.
 January 14 - Various insurgent attacks in the country killed seven policemen and two soldiers.
 January 15 - One policeman was killed in Shurqat.
 January 17 - Various insurgent attacks in the country killed six policemen.
 January 18 - Four policemen were killed in and around Baqubah.
 January 18–19 - 15 policemen and 3 soldiers were killed during the Day of Ashura fighting.
 January 19 - Seven policemen were killed in three suicide bombings in Ramadi.
 January 22 - One policeman was killed in Shurqat.
 January 23 - Three soldiers were killed in Baghdad.
 January 24 - Various insurgent attacks in the country killed five policemen and three soldiers.
 January 26 - Various insurgent attacks in the country killed two policemen.
 January 28 - Two policemen were killed south of Mosul.
 January 29 - One soldier was killed during a raid.
 January 30 - One policeman was killed by a roadside bomb in Baghdad.
 January 31 - Three policemen were killed by a roadside bomb in Baghdad.
 February
 February 1 - Various insurgent attacks in the country killed two policemen and one soldier.
 February 2 - Various insurgent attacks in the country killed four policemen and three were captured.
 February 3 - Various insurgent attacks in the country killed three policemen and one soldier.
 February 4 - Various insurgent attacks in the country killed three policemen and three soldiers.
 February 5 - Various insurgent attacks in Amarah killed three soldiers.
 February 6 - Various insurgent attacks in the country killed two policemen and two soldiers.
 February 7 - One policeman was killed in Siniya.
 February 8 - One policeman was killed when his checkpoint was attacked in Saqlawiyah.
 February 10 - Four soldiers were killed when a suicide bomber attacked their checkpoint near Mosul.
 February 11 - One soldier was killed in Mosul.
 February 12 - Various insurgent attacks in the country killed three policemen.
 February 16 - One soldier was killed in Baqubah.
 February 17 - One policeman was killed in Mosul.
 February 18 - One policeman was killed in Tikrit.
 February 19 - Various insurgent attacks in the country killed 16 policemen and one soldier.
 February 20 - Various insurgent attacks in Mosul killed five policemen.
 February 21 - Various insurgent attacks in the country killed two policemen and 12 soldiers.
 February 22 - Various insurgent attacks in the country killed nine policemen.
 February 23 - Various insurgent attacks in the country killed eight policemen.
 February 25 - Various insurgent attacks in the country killed seven policemen and eight soldiers.
 February 26 - Various insurgent attacks in the country killed one policeman and two soldiers.
 February 27 - Various insurgent attacks in the country killed one policeman and one soldier.
 February 28 - One policeman was killed in Mosul.
 February 29 - One soldier was killed when a house he raided blew up in Abu Khamees.
 March
 March 1 - Various insurgent attacks in the country killed six soldiers.
 March 2 - Various insurgent attacks in the country killed three policemen and one soldier.
 March 3 - Various insurgent attacks in the country killed 15 policemen and six soldiers.
 March 4 - Various insurgent attacks in the country killed one policeman and eight soldiers.
 March 6 - Various insurgent attacks in the country killed nine policemen and three soldiers.
 March 7 - Five policemen were killed when a suicide bomber attacked their police station in Mosul.
 March 8 - Two soldiers were killed during a raid in Baghdad.
 March 9 - One policeman was killed by a roadside bomb in Tikrit.
 March 10 - Various insurgent attacks in the country killed four policemen.
 March 11 - Four policemen were killed when their checkpoint was attacked in Mosul.
 March 12 - One policeman was killed in Baiji.
 March 13 - One soldier was killed by a suicide bomber in Kirkuk.
 March 14 - Various insurgent attacks in the country killed three policemen and three soldiers.
 March 15 - One policeman was killed in street fighting in Al Kut.
 March 16 - Various insurgent attacks in the country killed six policemen and two soldiers and two soldiers were captured.
 March 17 - Various insurgent attacks in the country killed three policemen.
 March 18 - Various insurgent attacks in the country killed four policemen and one was captured.
 March 19 - Various insurgent attacks in the country killed 22 policemen and one soldier.
 March 20 - Various insurgent attacks in the country killed four policemen and three soldiers.
 March 21 - Various insurgent attacks in the country killed six policemen.
 March 23 - Various insurgent attacks in the country killed seven policemen and 19 soldiers.
 March 24 - Various insurgent attacks in the country killed three policemen and two soldiers.
 March 25–31 - 15 policemen and 15 soldiers were killed during the Battle of Basra.
 March 25 - Two policemen were killed in fighting in Aziziya, north of Al Kut.
 March 26 - 13 policemen and 12 soldiers were killed in street fighting in Al Kut, Diwaniyah, Hilla and Amarah.
 March 27 - Various insurgent attacks in the country killed 15 policemen and 10 soldiers.
 March 28 - Various insurgent attacks in the country killed 14 policemen and one soldier.
 March 29 - Three policemen were killed in street fighting in Al Kut and Karbala.
 March 30 - Various insurgent attacks in the country killed 10 policemen and 10 soldiers.
 March 31 - One soldier was killed during a raid in Baghdad.
 April
 April 1 - Various insurgent attacks in the country killed two soldiers.
 April 2 - Various insurgent attacks in the country killed 13 policemen.
 April 3 - Various insurgent attacks in the country killed six policemen and three soldiers.
 April 4 - Various insurgent attacks in the country killed eight policemen.
 April 5 - Various insurgent attacks in the country killed 11 policemen.
 April 7 - Various insurgent attacks in the country killed two soldiers.
 April 9 - Various insurgent attacks in the country killed four policemen and four soldiers.
 April 10 - One policeman was killed in Tikrit.
 April 11 - Various insurgent attacks in the country killed six policemen.
 April 12 - Various insurgent attacks in the country killed one policeman and three soldiers.
 April 13 - Various insurgent attacks in the country killed one policeman and one soldier.
 April 14 - Various insurgent attacks in the country killed three policemen and 16 soldiers.
 April 15 - Various insurgent attacks in the country killed nine policemen.
 April 16 - One policeman was killed in Khan Bani Saad.
 April 17 - Various insurgent attacks in the country killed seven policemen and four soldiers.
 April 18 - Various insurgent attacks in the country killed six soldiers.
 April 19 - Various insurgent attacks in the country killed five policemen and 12 soldiers.
 April 20 - Various insurgent attacks in the country killed two policemen.
 April 21 - Various insurgent attacks in the country killed five policemen.
 April 22 - Various insurgent attacks in the country killed five policemen and six soldiers.
 April 23 - Various insurgent attacks in the country killed three policemen.
 April 24 - Various insurgent attacks in the country killed three policemen and one soldier.
 April 25 - Various insurgent attacks in the country killed two policemen and one soldier.
 April 26 - Various insurgent attacks in the country killed five policemen and five soldiers.
 April 27 - Various insurgent attacks in the country killed 14 policemen and two soldiers.
 April 28 - One soldier was killed in Mosul.
 April 29 - Various insurgent attacks in Mosul killed one policeman and one soldier.
 May
 May 1 - Various insurgent attacks in the country killed three soldiers.
 May 3 - Various insurgent attacks in the country killed two policemen and two soldiers.
 May 5 - Various insurgent attacks in the country killed 11 soldiers.
 May 6 - Various insurgent attacks in the country killed two policemen and one soldier.
 May 7 - Various insurgent attacks in the country killed six soldiers.
 May 9 - Various insurgent attacks in the country killed 13 policemen and four soldiers.
 May 11 - One soldier was killed in Kirkuk.
 May 12 - Various insurgent attacks in the country killed two soldiers.
 May 13 - Various insurgent attacks in the country killed one policeman and seven soldiers.
 May 14 - One soldier was killed by a suicide bomber in Yusufiyah.
 May 15 - Various insurgent attacks in the country killed two policeman and one soldier.
 May 16 - Four policemen were killed when a suicide bomber attacked a police station in Fallujah.
 May 17 - Various insurgent attacks in the country killed three soldiers.
 May 18 - Two soldiers were killed by a car bomb in Baghdad.
 May 19 - Various insurgent attacks in the country killed 14 policemen and one soldier.
 May 20 - One policeman was killed in Basra.
 May 21 - Four soldiers were killed when their checkpoint was attacked in Jalawla.
 May 22 - Various insurgent attacks in the country killed two policemen and seven soldiers.
 May 24 - Various insurgent attacks in the country killed five soldiers.
 May 25 - Various insurgent attacks in the country killed two policemen and one soldier.
 May 26 - Various insurgent attacks in the country killed two policemen and one soldier.
 May 27 - Various insurgent attacks in the country killed three policemen and five soldiers.
 May 28 - Two soldiers were killed during a raid in Baghdad.
 May 29 - Various insurgent attacks in the country killed 19 policemen and two soldiers.
 May 30 - One policeman was killed north of Basra.
 May 31 - Nine policemen were killed when a suicide bomber attacked their checkpoint in Hit.
 June
 June 2 - One policeman was killed in Kirkuk.
 June 4 - Various insurgent attacks in the country killed seven policemen and two soldiers.
 June 5 - One soldier was killed by a roadside bomb in Baghdad.
 June 6 - Various insurgent attacks in the country killed three policemen and one was captured.
 June 7 - Various insurgent attacks in the country killed two policemen and eight soldiers.
 June 8 - Various insurgent attacks in the country killed eight policemen and one soldier.
 June 9 - Various insurgent attacks in the country killed two policemen and one soldier.
 June 10 - Various insurgent attacks in the country killed two soldiers.
 June 11 - Various insurgent attacks in the country killed four policemen and three soldiers.
 June 12 - One policeman was killed by a truck bomb in Baghdad.
 June 13 - Various insurgent attacks in the country killed one policeman and two soldiers.
 June 14 - Various insurgent attacks in the country killed one policeman and two soldiers.
 June 15 - Various insurgent attacks in the country killed two policemen and two soldiers.
 June 16 - One soldiers' body was fished out of the Tigris river in Suwayra.
 June 17 - Various insurgent attacks in the country killed seven policemen.
 June 18 - One policeman was killed in Kirkuk.
 June 19 - One policeman was killed in Mosul.
 June 20 - Various insurgent attacks in the country killed one policeman and one soldier.
 June 22 - Various insurgent attacks in the country killed nine policemen and three soldiers.
 June 23 - Various insurgent attacks in Mosul killed two policemen.
 June 25 - One soldier was killed when the hose he raided blew up in Mullaeid.
 June 26 - One soldier was killed during a raid in Tuz Khormato.
 June 29 - Various insurgent attacks in the country killed one policeman and one soldier.
 June 30 - Various insurgent attacks in Mosul killed three soldiers.
 July
 July 1 - Various insurgent attacks in the country killed three policemen.
 July 2 - One policeman was killed by a roadside bomb in Mosul.
 July 3 - Various insurgent attacks in Mosul killed two policemen.
 July 5 - Two policemen were killed in Mosul.
 July 6 - Various insurgent attacks in the country killed two soldiers.
 July 8 - One policeman was killed in Tikrit.
 July 9 - Various insurgent attacks in Mosul killed two policemen.
 July 11 - Various insurgent attacks in the country killed two policemen.
 July 12 - Various insurgent attacks in the country killed two policemen and one soldier.
 July 13 - Various insurgent attacks in the country killed five policemen.
 July 14 - One policeman was killed in Mosul.
 July 15 - Two suicide bombers attacked an Iraqi Army recruiting station killing 35 recruits and soldiers in Baqubah.
 July 16 - One soldier was killed in Mosul.
 July 18 - Various insurgent attacks in Mosul killed one policeman and four soldiers.
 July 19 - Various insurgent attacks in the country killed four policemen.
 July 20 - Various insurgent attacks in the country killed four policemen.
 July 21 - Various insurgent attacks in the country killed one policeman and two soldiers.
 July 22 - One policeman was killed in Kirkuk.
 July 23 - Two soldiers were killed when their checkpoint was attacked in Mosul.
 July 24 - One soldier was killed when a suicide bomber attacked his checkpoint in Mosul.
 July 25 - One soldier was killed by a sniper in Mosul.
 July 26 - Various insurgent attacks in the country killed two policemen.
 July 27 - Various insurgent attacks in the country killed two policemen and four soldiers.
 July 28 - Four soldiers were killed during a raid in Mosul.
 July 30 - Various insurgent attacks in Baghdad killed one policeman and one soldier.
 July 31 - Various insurgent attacks in the country killed four policemen and one soldier.
 August
 August 1 - Three soldiers were killed by a roadside bomb southwest of Kirkuk.
 August 4 - Various insurgent attacks in the country killed four policemen and one soldier.
 August 5 - Two soldiers were killed during a raid in Baghdad.
 August 7 - Four policemen were killed by a booby-trapped body in Mosul.
 August 8 - Various insurgent attacks in the country killed one policeman and one soldier.
 August 9 - One policeman was killed by a booby-trapped building in Buhriz.
 August 10 - Various insurgent attacks in the country killed one policeman and one soldier.
 August 11 - Various insurgent attacks in the country killed five policemen.
 August 12 - Various insurgent attacks in the country killed two policemen and one soldier.
 August 13 - Two policemen were killed by a roadside bomb in Buhriz.
 August 14 - Various insurgent attacks in the country killed three policemen and two soldiers.
 August 15 - One soldier was killed by a car bomb in Mosul.
 August 16 - One policeman was killed in Mosul.
 August 18 - Five policemen were killed when a suicide bomber attacked their checkpoint in Ramadi.
 August 21 - Various insurgent attacks in the country killed five policemen and one soldier.
 August 22 - One soldier was killed in Buhriz.
 August 23 - Two soldiers were killed in Mosul.
 August 24 - Four soldiers were killed by a roadside bomb in Balad Ruz.
 August 25 - Various insurgent attacks in the country killed one policeman and two soldiers.
 August 26 - A suicide bomber attacked a police recruiting station killing 35 recruits in Jalawla.
 August 28 - Various insurgent attacks in the country killed one policeman and one soldier.
 August 31 - One policeman was killed in Mosul.
 September
 September 2 - Various insurgent attacks in the country killed three soldiers.
 September 3 - Various insurgent attacks in the country killed three policemen and three soldiers.
 September 4 - Various insurgent attacks in Mosul killed two policemen.
 September 5 - Various insurgent attacks in the country killed two policemen and one soldier.
 September 6 - One policeman was killed in Mosul.
 September 7 - One policeman was killed in Mosul.
 September 8 - Various insurgent attacks in the country killed eight policemen and three soldier.
 September 9 - Various insurgent attacks in the country killed four policemen.
 September 12 - The bodies of two soldiers, who may have been dead for a year and a half, were found in Ghalibyah.
 September 13 - Nine soldiers were killed by a roadside bomb in Khanaqin.
 September 14 - Various insurgent attacks in the country killed 10 policemen.
 September 15 - A suicide bomber attacked the home of a police commissioner in Balad Ruz killing 18 policemen.
 September 16 - Various insurgent attacks in the country killed six policemen.
 September 17 - One policeman was killed by a roadside bomb in Baghdad.
 September 18 - Three soldiers were killed by a roadside bomb in Mosul.
 September 19 - Two soldiers were killed by a roadside bomb in Balad Ruz.
 September 20 - Various insurgent attacks in the country killed five policemen and two soldiers.
 September 21 - Various insurgent attacks in the country killed four policemen and one soldier.
 September 22 - Various insurgent attacks in the country killed one policeman and two soldiers.
 September 24 - Various insurgent attacks in the country killed 31 policeman and one soldier.
 September 26 - Various insurgent attacks in the country killed two policemen and one soldier.
 September 27 - Various insurgent attacks in the country killed one policeman and two soldiers.
 September 28 - Various insurgent attacks in the country killed one policeman and four soldiers.
 September 29 - Two policemen were killed in Mosul.
 October
 October 2 - Four soldiers were killed when a suicide bomber attacked their checkpoint in Baghdad.
 October 3 - Two policemen were killed in Mosul.
 October 5 - Two policemen were killed when their police station was attacked in Ramadi.
 October 6 - One policeman was killed in Mosul.
 October 7 - One policeman was killed in Mosul.
 October 8 - Various insurgent attacks in the country killed four policemen.
 October 9 - Various insurgent attacks in the country killed five policemen and one soldier.
 October 11 - Various insurgent attacks in the country killed one policeman and three soldiers.
 October 12 - Various insurgent attacks in the country killed four soldiers.
 October 13 - One policeman was killed in Mosul.
 October 15 - Various insurgent attacks in the country killed three policemen.
 October 16 - Three policemen were killed during fighting in Amarah.
 October 17 - One soldier was killed by a roadside bomb in Mosul.
 October 18 - Various insurgent attacks in the country killed one policeman and one soldier.
 October 19 - One policeman was killed in Zanjili.
 October 22 - One policeman was killed by a roadside bomb in Balad Ruz. Also, the bodies of 32 army recruits, who were captured in November 2005, were found in a mass grave near Al Qaim.
 October 23 - Various insurgent attacks in the country killed three policemen.
 October 24 - Various insurgent attacks in the country killed one policeman and one soldier.
 October 25 - Various insurgent attacks in the country killed two policemen and three soldiers.
 October 26 - One policeman was killed in Mosul.
 October 27 - One soldier was killed by a bomb planet on his car in Tuz Khormato.
 October 28 - Various insurgent attacks in the country killed seven policemen.
 October 29 - Various insurgent attacks in the country killed four policemen and one soldier.
 October 30 - One policeman was killed in Mosul.
 November
 November 1 - Various insurgent attacks in the country killed two policemen and four soldiers.
 November 2 - Various insurgent attacks in the country killed one policeman and two soldiers.
 November 3 - Two soldiers were killed by a roadside bomb in Mosul.
 November 4 - Various insurgent attacks in the country killed three policemen and one soldier.
 November 5 - Various insurgent attacks in the country killed three policemen.
 November 8 - Various insurgent attacks in the country killed five policemen and two soldiers.
 November 9 - Various insurgent attacks in Mosul killed four soldiers.
 November 10 - Two policemen were killed by a roadside bomb in Samarra.
 November 11 - One policeman was killed in Amarah.
 November 13 - Various insurgent attacks in the country killed four policemen.
 November 16 - Various insurgent attacks in the country killed nine policemen.
 November 17 - Various insurgent attacks in Mosul killed two policemen.
 November 19 - One policeman was killed by a sticky bomb on his car in Samarra.
 November 20 - One soldier was killed by a bomb in Saidiya.
 November 24 - Various insurgent attacks in the country killed two policemen.
 November 27 - Various insurgent attacks in Baghdad killed one policeman and one soldier.
 November 28 - Two soldiers were killed by a booby-trapped house in Baqubah.
 November 29 - One policeman was killed by a bomb in Mosul.
 December
 December 1 - Various insurgent attacks in the country killed 17 policemen and one soldier.
 December 2 - Five soldiers were killed by a roadside bomb in Hilla.
 December 4 - Various insurgent attacks in the country killed seven policemen and one soldier.
 December 5 - Various insurgent attacks in the country killed three policemen.
 December 6 - Various insurgent attacks in the country killed two policemen and three soldiers.
 December 7 - Three policemen were killed by three separate roadside bombs in Kirkuk.
 December 13 - Various insurgent attacks in the country killed one policeman and one soldier.
 December 14 - One policeman was killed in Al Kut.
 December 15 - Nine policemen were killed when a suicide bomber attacked their checkpoint in Khan Dara, between Baghdad and Fallujah.
 December 16 - Various insurgent attacks in Baqubah killed one policeman and four soldiers.
 December 17 - Various insurgent attacks in the country killed three policemen and two soldiers.
 December 18 - One policeman was killed in Mosul.
 December 21 - Various insurgent attacks in Mosul killed one policeman and three soldiers.
 December 23 - Three policemen were killed by a roadside bomb in Baghdad.
 December 26 - Various insurgent attacks in the country killed 10 policemen and four soldiers.
 December 27 - One soldier was killed by a roadside bomb in Mussayab.
 December 28 - Two policemen were killed by a roadside bomb in Fallujah.
 December 29 - One policeman was killed by a roadside bomb in Mahaweel.
 December 30 - One policeman was killed in Mosul.
 December 31 - Various insurgent attacks in the country killed one policeman and two soldiers.

2007
 January
 January 1 - Various insurgent attacks in the country killed four soldiers.
 January 2 - One soldier was killed in Fallujah by a U.S. Marine.
 January 3 - Various insurgent attacks in the country killed one policeman and one soldier.
 January 4 - Various insurgent attacks in the country killed one policeman and one soldier.
 January 5 - Various insurgent attacks in the country killed seven policemen and 12 soldiers.
 January 6–9 - 20 soldiers were killed during the Battle of Haifa Street.
 January 6 - One policeman was killed in Diwaniyah.
 January 7 - Various insurgent attacks in the country killed seven policemen and 12 soldiers.
 January 8 - Various insurgent attacks in the country killed three policemen.
 January 11 - Various insurgent attacks in the country killed five policemen and one soldier.
 January 12 - One soldier was killed by a roadside bomb in Muqdadiyah.
 January 13 - One policeman was killed in Iskandariyah.
 January 14 - Various insurgent attacks in the country killed 11 policemen and one soldier and three soldiers were captured.
 January 15 - Various insurgent attacks in the country killed six policemen and four soldiers.
 January 16 - Two policemen were killed by a car bomb in Baghdad.
 January 17 - Various insurgent attacks in the country killed two policemen and one soldier.
 January 18 - Various insurgent attacks in the country killed two policemen.
 January 19 - Various insurgent attacks in the country killed five policemen and one soldier.
 January 20 - Various insurgent attacks in the country killed six policemen and one soldier.
 January 21 - Various insurgent attacks in the country killed four policemen and one soldier.
 January 22 - Various insurgent attacks in the country killed four policemen and two soldiers.
 January 23 - Various insurgent attacks in the country killed seven policemen and two soldiers.
 January 24 - Various insurgent attacks in the country killed five policemen.
 January 25 - One soldier was killed in Baghdad.
 January 26 - Various insurgent attacks in the country killed eight soldiers.
 January 28–29 - Six policemen and 19 soldiers were killed during the Third Battle of Najaf.
 January 28 - Various insurgent attacks in the country killed seven soldiers.
 January 29 - One policeman was killed by a sniper in Baghdad.
 January 30 - Two policemen were killed by a roadside bomb in Mosul.
 January 31 - Various insurgent attacks in the country killed four policemen and one soldier.
 February
 February 1 - Various insurgent attacks in the country killed two policemen and three soldiers.
 February 2 - One policeman was killed by a roadside bomb in Mosul.
 February 3 - Various insurgent attacks in the country killed five policemen and two soldiers.
 February 4 - Various insurgent attacks in the country killed eight policemen and two soldiers.
 February 5 - Various insurgent attacks in the country killed three policemen.
 February 6 - Various insurgent attacks in the country killed three policemen and two soldiers.
 February 7 - Various insurgent attacks in the country killed one policeman and one soldier.
 February 8 - Various insurgent attacks in the country killed 11 policemen and two soldiers.
 February 9 - Eight soldiers were killed by U.S. soldiers in Mosul.
 February 10 - Various insurgent attacks in the country killed one policeman and two soldiers.
 February 11 - Various insurgent attacks in the country killed 32 policemen.
 February 12 - Various insurgent attacks in the country killed four policemen and five soldiers.
 February 13 - Two policemen were killed and one was captured in Kharnabat.
 February 14 - Various insurgent attacks in the country killed eight policemen and one soldier.
 February 15 - Various insurgent attacks in the country killed five policemen and one soldier.
 February 16 - Various insurgent attacks in the country killed three policemen and one soldier.
 February 17 - Various insurgent attacks in the country killed five policemen.
 February 18 - Two policemen were killed during fighting in Tikrit.
 February 19 - Various insurgent attacks in the country killed three policemen and one soldier.
 February 20 - Various insurgent attacks in the country killed six soldiers.
 February 21 - Various insurgent attacks in the country killed eight policemen and four soldiers.
 February 22 - Two policemen were killed when their police station was attacked in Baiji.
 February 24 - Various insurgent attacks in the country killed nine policemen.
 February 25 - Various insurgent attacks in the country killed four policemen and 13 soldiers.
 February 26 - Various insurgent attacks in the country killed eight policemen and 11 soldiers.
 February 27 - Various insurgent attacks in the country killed eight policemen and one soldier.
 February 28 - Various insurgent attacks in the country killed four policemen.
More than 330 Iraqi policemen and soldiers were confirmed to have been killed during the month of March, the list below includes 218 policemen and 78 soldiers.
 March
 March 1 - Various insurgent attacks in the country killed six policemen.
 March 2 - Various insurgent attacks in the country killed 15 policemen.
 March 3 - Various insurgent attacks in the country killed five policemen and one soldier.
 March 4 - Various insurgent attacks in the country killed 17 policemen and 10 soldiers and one soldier was captured.
 March 5 - Various insurgent attacks in the country killed 11 policemen and three soldiers.
 March 6 - Various insurgent attacks in the country killed one policeman and four soldiers.
 March 7 - Various insurgent attacks in the country killed 13 policemen.
 March 8 - Various insurgent attacks in the country killed eight policemen and 15 soldiers.
 March 9 - One policeman was killed when his police station was attacked in Hibhib.
 March 10 - Various insurgent attacks in the country killed six policemen and one soldier.
 March 11 - Various insurgent attacks in the country killed three policemen and one soldier.
 March 12 - Various insurgent attacks in the country killed five policemen.
 March 13 - Various insurgent attacks in the country killed four policemen and four soldiers.
 March 14 - Various insurgent attacks in the country killed eight policemen and one soldier and two soldiers were captured.
 March 15 - Various insurgent attacks in the country killed five policemen and one soldier.
 March 16 - Various insurgent attacks in the country killed five policemen.
 March 17 - Various insurgent attacks in the country killed six policemen.
 March 18 - Various insurgent attacks in the country killed 15 policemen.
 March 19 - Various insurgent attacks in the country killed three policemen and three soldiers.
 March 20 - Various insurgent attacks in the country killed 13 policemen and one soldier.
 March 21 - Various insurgent attacks in the country killed six policemen.
 March 22 - Various insurgent attacks in the country killed one policeman and one soldier and 15 policemen were captured.
 March 23 - Various insurgent attacks in the country killed four policemen and three soldiers.
 March 24 - Various insurgent attacks in the country killed 34 policemen and four soldiers.
 March 25 - Various insurgent attacks in the country killed one policeman and 14 soldiers.
 March 26 - Various insurgent attacks in the country killed six policemen.
 March 27 - Various insurgent attacks in the country killed two policemen and one soldier.
 March 28 - Various insurgent attacks in the country killed two policemen and nine soldiers and one policeman was captured.
 March 29 - Various insurgent attacks in the country killed eight policemen.
 March 30 - Various insurgent attacks in the country killed two policemen and one soldier.
 March 31 - Various insurgent attacks in the country killed two policemen.
Over 300 Iraqi policemen and soldiers were confirmed to have been killed during the month of April, the list below includes 152 policemen and 112 soldiers.
 April
 April 1 - Various insurgent attacks in the country killed two policemen and six soldiers.
 April 2 - Various insurgent attacks in the country killed three policemen and two soldiers.
 April 3 - Various insurgent attacks in the country killed 11 policemen.
 April 4 - Various insurgent attacks in the country killed five policemen and three soldiers.
 April 5 - Various insurgent attacks in the country killed two policemen and 11 soldiers and one policeman was captured.
 April 6 - Various insurgent attacks in the country killed three policemen and three soldiers.
 April 7 - Various insurgent attacks in the country killed nine policemen and five soldiers.
 April 8 - Various insurgent attacks in the country killed three soldiers.
 April 9 - Various insurgent attacks in the country killed one policeman and three soldiers.
 April 10 - Various insurgent attacks in the country killed 18 policemen and six soldiers.
 April 11 - Various insurgent attacks in the country killed four policemen.
 April 12 - Various insurgent attacks in the country killed five policemen and one soldier.
 April 13 - Various insurgent attacks in the country killed three policemen.
 April 14 - Various insurgent attacks in the country killed eight policemen and 13 soldiers.
 April 15 - Various insurgent attacks in the country killed eight policemen and one soldier.
 April 16 - Various insurgent attacks in the country killed one policeman and 13 soldiers.
 April 17 - Various insurgent attacks in the country killed six policemen.
 April 18 - Various insurgent attacks in the country killed nine policemen and two soldiers.
 April 19 - Various insurgent attacks in the country killed 12 policemen and 16 soldiers.
 April 20 - Various insurgent attacks in the country killed three policemen and three soldiers.
 April 22 - One policeman was killed by a roadside bomb in Baghdad.
 April 23 - Various insurgent attacks in the country killed 16 policemen.
 April 24 - Various insurgent attacks in the country killed three policemen.
 April 25 - Various insurgent attacks in the country killed seven policemen.
 April 26 - Various insurgent attacks in Khalis killed 11 soldiers.
 April 27 - Various insurgent attacks in the country killed six policemen and two soldiers.
 April 28 - Various insurgent attacks in the country killed one policeman and two soldiers.
 April 29 - Various insurgent attacks in the country killed three policemen and three soldiers.
 April 30 - Various insurgent attacks in the country killed two policemen and one soldier.
 May
 May 1 - Various insurgent attacks in the country killed two policemen.
 May 2 - One policeman was killed in Amara.
 May 3 - Various insurgent attacks in the country killed six policemen and two soldiers.
 May 4 - Various insurgent attacks in the country killed 12 policemen and one soldier.
 May 5 - Various insurgent attacks in the country killed 11 policemen and 16 soldiers.
 May 6 - Various insurgent attacks in the country killed 18 policemen.
 May 7 - Various insurgent attacks in the country killed nine policemen and 18 soldiers.
 May 8 - Various insurgent attacks in the country killed eight policemen and two soldiers.
 May 9 - Various insurgent attacks in the country killed one policeman and one soldier.
 May 10 - Various insurgent attacks in the country killed six policeman and six soldiers.
 May 11 - Various insurgent attacks in the country killed 13 policemen and five soldiers.
 May 12 - One policeman was killed in Diwaniya.
 May 13 - Three captured soldiers were executed.
 May 14 - Various insurgent attacks in the country killed seven policemen and two soldiers.
 May 15 - Various insurgent attacks in the country killed three policemen and five soldiers.
 May 16 - Various insurgent attacks in the country killed seven policemen and four soldiers.
 May 17 - Various insurgent attacks in the country killed six policemen.
 May 18 - Various insurgent attacks in the country killed eight policemen and two soldiers.
 May 19 - Various insurgent attacks in the country killed three policemen and eight soldiers.
 May 20 - Various insurgent attacks in the country killed six policemen and five soldiers.
 May 21 - Various insurgent attacks in the country killed two policemen and six soldiers.
 May 22 - Various insurgent attacks in the country killed two policemen and five soldiers.
 May 23 - Various insurgent attacks in the country killed eight policemen and five soldiers.
 May 24 - Various insurgent attacks in the country killed six policemen and one soldier.
 May 26 - Various insurgent attacks in the country killed eight policemen.
 May 27 - Various insurgent attacks in the country killed four policemen and two soldiers.
 May 28 - Various insurgent attacks in the country killed eight policemen.
 May 29 - Two policemen were killed in Shurqat.
 May 30 - Various insurgent attacks in the country killed three policemen and five soldiers.
 May 31 - Various insurgent attacks in the country killed 11 policemen and four soldiers.
 June
 June 1 - Various insurgent attacks in the country killed one policeman and three soldiers and five policemen were captured.
 June 2 - Various insurgent attacks in the country killed three policemen and 15 soldiers.
 June 3 - One soldier was killed in fighting in Diwaniyah.
 June 4 - Various insurgent attacks in the country killed one policeman and three soldiers and one soldier was captured.
 June 5 - Various insurgent attacks in the country killed four policemen and five soldiers.
 June 6 - Various insurgent attacks in the country killed eight policemen and four soldiers.
 June 7 - Various insurgent attacks in the country killed two policemen.
 June 8 - Various insurgent attacks in the country killed five policemen and one soldier.
 June 9 - Various insurgent attacks in the country killed six policemen and 17 soldiers.
 June 10 - Various insurgent attacks in the country killed 18 policemen and 10 soldiers.
 June 11 - Various insurgent attacks in the country killed two policemen and one soldier and one policeman was captured.
 June 12 - Various insurgent attacks in the country killed 12 policemen and one soldier and one policeman was captured.
 June 13 - Various insurgent attacks in the country killed nine policemen and three soldiers.
 June 14 - Various insurgent attacks in the country killed 11 policemen and 11 soldiers.
 June 16 - One policeman was killed in Samarra.
 June 17 - Various insurgent attacks in the country killed nine policemen.
 June 18 - Various insurgent attacks in the country killed 16 policemen and nine soldiers.
 June 19 - Various insurgent attacks in the country killed two policemen and one soldier.
 June 20 - Various insurgent attacks in the country killed 12 policemen and seven soldiers.
 June 21 - Various insurgent attacks in the country killed two policemen and one soldier.
 June 22 - Various insurgent attacks in the country killed 25 policemen and one soldier.
 June 23 - Various insurgent attacks in the country killed 10 policemen.
 June 24 - Various insurgent attacks in the country killed seven policemen and two soldiers.
 June 25 - Various insurgent attacks in the country killed 19 policemen and three soldiers.
 June 26 - Various insurgent attacks in the country killed one policeman and two soldiers.
 June 27 - Various insurgent attacks in the country killed 13 policemen and nine soldiers.
 June 28 - One policeman was killed in Fallujah.
 June 29 - Various insurgent attacks in the country killed five policemen and eight soldiers.
 June 30 - Various insurgent attacks in the country killed 27 policemen.
 July
 July 1 - Various insurgent attacks in the country killed 15 policemen and four soldiers and one soldier was captured.
 July 2 - Various insurgent attacks in the country killed seven policemen.
 July 3 - Various insurgent attacks in the country killed four policemen and two soldiers.
 July 4 - Various insurgent attacks in the country killed 16 policemen and seven soldiers.
 July 5 - Various insurgent attacks in the country killed one policeman and 10 soldiers.
 July 6 - Various insurgent attacks in the country killed seven policemen and six soldiers.
 July 7 - Various insurgent attacks in the country killed two policemen and 16 soldiers.
 July 8 - Various insurgent attacks in the country killed two policemen and 25 soldiers.
 July 9 - Various insurgent attacks in the country killed five policemen and 11 soldiers.
 July 10 - Various insurgent attacks in the country killed 12 policemen and eight soldiers.
 July 11 - Various insurgent attacks in the country killed five policemen and three soldiers.
 July 12 - Various insurgent attacks in the country killed six policemen and five soldiers.
 July 13 - Various insurgent attacks in the country killed 11 policemen and two soldiers.
 July 14 - Various insurgent attacks in the country killed one policeman and six soldiers.
 July 15 - Various insurgent attacks in the country killed 18 policemen and one soldier.
 July 16 - Various insurgent attacks in the country killed nine policemen and five soldiers.
 July 17 - Various insurgent attacks in the country killed six policemen and four soldiers.
 July 18 - Various insurgent attacks in the country killed six policemen.
 July 19 - Various insurgent attacks in the country killed 15 policemen and one soldier.
 July 20 - 13 policemen were captured in Muqdadiyah.
 July 21 - Various insurgent attacks in the country killed 11 policemen.
 July 22 - Various insurgent attacks in the country killed five policemen.
 July 23 - Various insurgent attacks in the country killed 10 policemen and 13 soldiers.
 July 24 - Various insurgent attacks in the country killed one policeman and two soldiers.
 July 25 - Various insurgent attacks in the country killed four policemen and two soldiers.
 July 26 - Various insurgent attacks in the country killed 10 policemen and one soldier.
 July 27 - Various insurgent attacks in the country killed 10 policemen.
 July 28 - Various insurgent attacks in the country killed seven policemen and nine soldiers.
 July 29 - Various insurgent attacks in the country killed five policemen and one soldier.
 July 30 - Various insurgent attacks in the country killed seven policemen and nine soldiers.
 July 31 - Various insurgent attacks in the country killed three policemen and two soldiers.
 August
 August 1 - Various insurgent attacks in the country killed three policemen and 10 soldiers.
 August 2 - One soldier was killed by a roadside bomb west of Kirkuk.
 August 4 - Various insurgent attacks in the country killed one policeman and six soldiers.
 August 6 - Various insurgent attacks in the country killed two policemen and five soldiers.
 August 7 - One soldier was killed when a suicide bomber attacked his checkpoint in Arab Shoka.
 August 8 - Various insurgent attacks in the country killed seven policemen and one policeman was captured.
 August 9 - One policeman was killed in a mortar attack in Basra.
 August 10 - Four soldiers were killed by a suicide bomber in Ein Zala.
 August 11 - Various insurgent attacks in the country killed two policemen.
 August 12 - Various insurgent attacks in the country killed three policemen and three soldiers.
 August 13 - Various insurgent attacks in the country killed five policemen and one soldier.
 August 14 - Various insurgent attacks in the country killed three policemen and one soldier.
 August 15 - Various insurgent attacks in the country killed two policemen.
 August 16 - One policeman was killed in Baghdad.
 August 18 - One policeman was killed in Hilla.
 August 19 - Various insurgent attacks in the country killed two policemen.
 August 20 - Various insurgent attacks in the country killed two policemen and seven soldiers.
 August 21 - Various insurgent attacks in the country killed four policemen.
 August 22 - Various insurgent attacks in the country killed 26 policemen and four soldiers.
 August 23 - Various insurgent attacks in the country killed two policemen.
 August 24 - Various insurgent attacks in the country killed one policeman and one soldier.
 August 25 - One soldier was killed by a roadside bomb in Baiji and one policeman was captured in Kirkuk.
 August 26 - Four policeman were killed in a U.S. helicopter strike on their police station in Khanaqin.
 August 27 - 10 policemen were killed during the Battle of Karbala.
 August 28 - Various insurgent attacks in the country killed two policemen and four soldiers.
 August 29 - Various insurgent attacks in the country killed 10 policemen and two soldiers.
 August 31 - Four policemen were killed by a suicide bomber in al-Jallam.
 September
 September 1 - Five soldiers were killed by a roadside bomb in Mosul.
 September 2 - Various insurgent attacks in the country killed two policemen and three soldiers.
 September 3 - Various insurgent attacks in the country killed three policemen.
 September 4 - Various insurgent attacks in the country killed five policemen and seven soldiers.
 September 5 - Various insurgent attacks in the country killed one policeman and one soldier.
 September 6 - Various insurgent attacks in the country killed eight soldiers.
 September 7 - The bodies of four policemen were found in Mosul.
 September 8 - Various insurgent attacks in the country killed five policemen and three soldiers.
 September 9 - Various insurgent attacks in the country killed seven policemen and five soldiers.
 September 10 - Various insurgent attacks in the country killed five policemen.
 September 11 - Various insurgent attacks in the country killed 13 policemen and five soldiers.
 September 12 - Various insurgent attacks in the country killed eight policemen.
 September 13 - Various insurgent attacks in the country killed two policemen.
 September 14 - Various insurgent attacks in the country killed 12 policemen and two soldiers.
 September 15 - Various insurgent attacks in the country killed two policemen and one soldier.
 September 16 - Various insurgent attacks in the country killed four policemen.
 September 17 - One policeman was killed by a sniper at his checkpoint in Fallujah.
 September 18 - Various insurgent attacks in the country killed two policemen.
 September 19 - One soldier was killed by a roadside bomb in Mosul.
 September 20 - Various insurgent attacks in the country killed four policemen.
 September 21 - One policeman and one soldier were killed by a roadside bomb in Kirkuk.
 September 22 - Various insurgent attacks in the country killed one policeman and five soldiers.
 September 23 - Various insurgent attacks in the country killed four policemen.
 September 24 - Various insurgent attacks in the country killed eight policemen and two soldiers.
 September 25 - Various insurgent attacks in the country killed seven policemen and one soldier.
 September 26 - Various insurgent attacks in the country killed three policemen.
 September 27 - Various insurgent attacks in the country killed five policemen and three soldiers.
 September 28 - Various insurgent attacks in the country killed four policemen.
 September 29 - Various insurgent attacks in the country killed seven policemen.
 September 30 - Various insurgent attacks in the country killed seven policemen and one soldier.
 October
 October 1 - The body of a policeman was found in Kirkuk.
 October 2 - Various insurgent attacks in the country killed five policemen.
 October 3 - Various insurgent attacks in the country killed three policemen and one soldier.
 October 4 - Various insurgent attacks in the country killed three policemen.
 October 5 - Two policemen were killed in fighting in Samarra.
 October 6 - Various insurgent attacks in the country killed five policemen.
 October 8 - Various insurgent attacks in the country killed one policeman and one soldier.
 October 9 - Various insurgent attacks in the country killed three policemen.
 October 10 - Various insurgent attacks in the country killed six policemen and one soldier.
 October 11 - Various insurgent attacks in the country killed four policemen.
 October 12 - Various insurgent attacks in the country killed two policemen.
 October 13 - One policeman was killed by a roadside bomb in Kirkuk.
 October 14 - Various insurgent attacks in the country killed five policemen and one soldier.
 October 15 - One policeman was killed by a suicide bomber in Hit.
 October 16 - Various insurgent attacks in the country killed 11 policemen and three soldiers.
 October 17 - Various insurgent attacks in the country killed eight policemen and one soldier and two soldiers were captured.
 October 18 - Various insurgent attacks in the country killed five policemen and one soldier.
 October 20 - Various insurgent attacks in the country killed three policemen and two soldiers.
 October 21 - Various insurgent attacks in the country killed four policemen.
 October 22 - One policeman was killed by a roadside bomb in Mosul.
 October 23 - Various insurgent attacks in the country killed three policemen.
 October 24 - Five policemen were killed by a mine in Basra.
 October 25 - One soldier was killed during a raid in Baghdad.
 October 26 - Two policemen were killed by a roadside bomb in Dagghara, near Diwaniya.
 October 27 - Various insurgent attacks in the country killed eight policemen and eight policemen were captured.
 October 28 - Various insurgent attacks in the country killed two policemen.
 October 29 - Various insurgent attacks in the country killed 32 policemen and one soldier.
 October 30 - Various insurgent attacks in the country killed seven policemen.
 October 31 - Various insurgent attacks in the country killed 10 policemen and one soldier.
 November
 November 1 - Various insurgent attacks in the country killed eight policemen and five soldiers.
 November 3 - Various insurgent attacks in the country killed two policemen and three soldiers.
 November 4 - Various insurgent attacks in the country killed four policemen and four soldiers.
 November 5 - Two policemen were killed in Tikrit.
 November 6 - Various insurgent attacks in the country killed nine policemen and three soldiers.
 November 7 - One soldier was killed in Suwayra.
 November 8 - Various insurgent attacks in the country killed 11 policemen and three soldiers.
 November 9 - Various insurgent attacks in the country killed four policemen and one soldier.
 November 10 - Various insurgent attacks in the country killed four policemen and three soldiers.
 November 11 - One policeman was killed during a raid in Baghdad.
 November 12 - Various insurgent attacks in the country killed three policemen.
 November 13 - Various insurgent attacks in the country killed seven policemen and six soldiers.
 November 15 - Three policemen were killed by a suicide bomber in Kirkuk.
 November 16 - Various insurgent attacks in the country killed four policemen.
 November 17 - Various insurgent attacks in the country killed one policeman and one soldier.
 November 18 - Various insurgent attacks in the country killed one policeman and two soldiers.
 November 19 - Various insurgent attacks in the country killed nine policemen.
 November 20 - Various insurgent attacks in the country killed two policemen and six soldiers.
 November 21 - Various insurgent attacks in the country killed two policemen.
 November 22 - Various insurgent attacks in the country killed one policeman and two soldiers and one soldier was captured.
 November 23 - Various insurgent attacks in the country killed two policemen.
 November 24 - Various insurgent attacks in the country killed 14 policemen and three soldiers.
 November 25 - Various insurgent attacks in the country killed six soldiers.
 November 26 - One policeman was killed in Al Kut.
 November 27 - Various insurgent attacks in the country killed five policemen.
 November 28 - One policeman was killed in Mosul.
 November 29 - Two soldiers were killed by a roadside bomb at Bamo, on the Iranian border.
 November 30 - Various insurgent attacks in the country killed 10 policemen.
led four policemen.
 December
 December 1 - One policeman was killed in Mosul.
 December 2 - Various insurgent attacks in the country killed five policemen and eight soldiers.
 December 3 - Various insurgent attacks in the country killed 12 policemen and one policeman was captured.
 December 4 - Various insurgent attacks in the country killed three policemen and four soldiers.
 December 5 - One policeman was killed in Muqdadiyah.
 December 6 - Various insurgent attacks in the country killed two policemen and eight soldiers.
 December 7 - Seven soldiers were killed when a suicide bomber attacked their checkpoint in Dali Abbas, north of Baqubah.
 December 8 - Various insurgent attacks in the country killed nine policemen and two soldiers.
 December 9 - Various insurgent attacks in the country killed eight policemen and three soldiers.
 December 10 - Various insurgent attacks in the country killed four policemen and one soldier.
 December 11 - Various insurgent attacks in the country killed five policemen and one soldier.
 December 12 - Two soldiers were killed during a raid in Baghdad.
 December 13 - Various insurgent attacks in the country killed six policemen.
 December 14 - One policeman was killed in al-Hayakel, in Wassit province.
 December 15 - Various insurgent attacks in the country killed four policemen and one soldier.
 December 16 - Various insurgent attacks in the country killed nine policemen.
 December 17 - Various insurgent attacks in the country killed three policemen and four soldiers.
 December 18 - Various insurgent attacks in the country killed 15 policemen.
 December 19 - One policeman was killed by U.S. soldiers in Fallujah.
 December 20 - Various insurgent attacks in the country killed two policemen and two soldiers.
 December 21 - Four policemen were killed by a suicide bomber in Yusufiya.
 December 22 - Various insurgent attacks in the country killed three policemen and one soldier.
 December 23 - Various insurgent attacks in the country killed one policeman and one soldier.
 December 24 - Various insurgent attacks in the country killed one policeman and one soldier.
 December 25 - Various insurgent attacks in the country killed two policemen.
 December 26 - Two soldiers were killed when their checkpoint was attacked in Buhriz.
 December 28 - One policeman was killed by a sniper in al-Mafraq.
 December 29 - Various insurgent attacks in the country killed four policemen and one soldier.
 December 30 - Two policemen were killed during a raid in Baghdad.
 December 31 - Various insurgent attacks in the country kil

2006
1,348-1,891 policemen and 627 soldiers were killed during 2006.

2005
1,497 policemen and an estimated 1,096 soldiers were killed during 2005.

2004
The list for 2004, only includes incidents of deaths of soldiers because it was estimated that 1,040 policemen were killed during 2004.
 January
 January 14 - A suicide bomber attacked a police station in Baqubah killing one soldier.
 January 17 - Two soldiers were killed by a roadside bomb south of Baghdad.
 January 29 - One soldier was killed when his checkpoint was attacked south of Kirkuk.
 January 30 - Three soldiers were killed when their checkpoint was attacked in Mosul.
 February
 February 11 - A suicide bomber attacked an Iraqi Army recruiting station killing 47 recruits in Baghdad.
 February 14 - 10 soldiers were killed when a police station was overrun in Fallujah.
 March
 March 8 - Three soldiers were killed when they were ambushed while on their way to work in Baghdad.
 March 17 - One soldier was killed by a roadside bomb in Mosul.
 March 22 - One soldier was killed by a car bomb at Anaconda air base in Balad.
 March 26 - Four soldiers were killed during a raid in Tikrit.
 April
 April 4 - Three soldiers were killed when a bomb exploded near their checkpoint in Samarra.
 April 9 - One soldier was killed in a rocket-propelled grenade attack on the ICDC Headquarters in Samarra.
 April 15 - Two soldiers were killed in an ambush in Kirkuk.
 April 16 - One soldier was killed in a mortar attack south of Fallujah.
 May
 May 2 - Two soldiers were killed in Baghdad.
 May 12 - One soldier was killed in Baqubah.
 May 15 - Gunmen attacked a military recruiting station in Mosul killing four recruits.
 May 21 - Four soldiers were killed when their checkpoint was attacked in Baqubah.
 May 29 - One soldier was killed in Kirkuk.
 May 31 - One soldier was killed when his checkpoint was attacked northeast of Baghdad.
 June
 June 1 - A suicide bomber attacked a military base in Baiji killing seven soldiers.
 June 17 - A car bomb attack on an Iraqi Army recruiting station killed 35 recruits in Baghdad.
 June 18 - Six soldiers were killed when a car bomb exploded at their checkpoint north of Baghdad.
 June 24 - Various insurgent attacks in the country killed five soldiers.
 June 27 - Six soldiers were killed in fighting outside Baqubah.
 July
 July 3 - Six soldiers were killed by a bomb at their checkpoint south of Baghdad.
 July 9 - One soldier was killed along with five Americans in a mortar attack on a military headquarters in Samarra.
 July 14 - A suicide bomber attacked a checkpoint near the British Embassy and the interim Iraqi government's headquarters in Baghdad killing four soldiers.
 July 17 - A suicide bomber attacked an ING base killing two soldiers in Mahmudiya.
 July 29 - Seven soldiers were killed during a raid near Suwaira.
 August
 August 3 - Various insurgent attacks in the country killed seven soldiers.
 August 5-August 27 - Four soldiers were killed during the Battle of Najaf.
 August 8 - One soldier was killed by a roadside bomb north-east of Baghdad.
 September
 September 6 - Three soldiers were killed along with seven U.S. Marines when a car bomb hit their convoy on the outskirts of Fallujah.
 September 15 - One soldier was killed by a car bomb in Suwayrah.
 September 18 - A suicide bomber attacked the ING headquarters in Kirkuk killing 19 soldiers and recruits.
 September 19 - Three captured soldiers were executed in Mosul. One soldier was killed by a car bomb in Samarra.
 September 22 - A suicide bomber attacked an ING recruiting station killing 11 recruits in Baghdad.
 September 25 - Seven captured Army recruits were executed in Baghdad. A U.S. soldier is facing 25 years of jail for the killing of a soldier in May.
 September 28 - Various insurgent attacks in the country killed eight soldiers.
 October
 October 9–11 soldiers were killed in an attack on the ING compound in Karabilah.
 October 19 - Four soldiers were killed in a mortar attack on an ING headquarters near Taji.
 October 23 - 49 captured Army recruits were beheaded near Kirkuk. Various insurgent attacks in and near Samarra killed six soldiers.
 October 29 - 11 captured soldiers were executed.
 November
 November 3 - Three captured soldiers were beheaded.
 November 6 - An Army commander is killed in an attack in Samarra.
 November 7-December 23 - 11 soldiers were killed in the Second Battle of Fallujah.
 November 8-November 16–26 soldiers were killed during the Battle of Mosul and another 76 were captured and executed.
 November 12 - One soldier was killed when his post was attacked in Baqubah.
 November 15 - Five soldiers were killed in attacks in Suwaira.
 November 20 - An Army recruit was killed in Baqubah.
 November 21 - 17 captured soldiers were executed in Kisik. Nine soldiers were killed when their convoy was ambushed in Ramadi.
 November 23 - One soldier was killed in Kirkuk.
 November 25 - Three soldiers were killed when their convoy was ambushed near Mosul.
 December
 December 3 - An Army captain was killed in Karbala.
 December 4 - A suicide bomber attacked a Kurdish militia bus killing 18 soldiers in Mosul.
 December 5 - Various insurgent attacks in the country killed six soldiers.
 December 7 - Three soldiers were killed by a roadside bomb south of Baghdad.
 December 8 - The body of an executed soldier was found in the Hillah river, south of Baghdad.
 December 11 - Seven soldiers were killed in an attack on their bus in Hit.
 December 14 - Various insurgent attacks in the country killed five soldiers.
 December 16 - Three soldiers were killed by a roadside bomb in Baghdad.
 December 21 - A suicide bomber attacked a U.S. military base in Mosul killing four soldiers along with 18 Americans.
 December 25 - Five soldiers were killed by a roadside bomb in Mosul.
 December 26 - Five captured soldiers were executed in Ramadi.
 December 28 - Five soldiers were killed by a car bomb in Baqubah.

2003
260 policemen were killed between May 1, 2003, and the end of the year. 23 Kurdish militiamen were killed during the initial invasion of Iraq.

See also
Iraq War
Casualties of the Iraq War

References

Iraq War casualties
Fat